QI Hui (齐晖, born 13 January 1985 in Fuzhou, Fujian) is an Olympic and former World Record holding breaststroke swimmer from China. She held the World Record in the long course Women's 200 Breaststroke from April 2001-July 2004. She specializes in breaststroke but is also an individual medley swimmer.

History
Qi competed at the 1997 Chinese National Games, aged 12, where she placed 4th in the 200 breaststroke (2:30.77).  She made her international debut at the 1998 Goodwill Games in New York.  She won silver behind Japan's Masami Tanaka in the 200 breaststroke (2:28.44 to 2:28.71) at the 1998 Asian Games in Bangkok, where she was the youngest athlete in the Chinese delegation.

Qi continued climbing up the world rankings in 1999.  At the World Short Course Championships in Hong Kong, she placed 3rd behind Tanaka and South Africa's Olympic champion Penny Heyns in the 200 breaststroke (2:25.05).  A few months later, she broke 1992 Olympic champion Kyoko Iwasaki's Asian record (long course) with a 2:26.51.  This ranked her 4th globally in 1999.

The 2000 Olympics in Sydney proved to be a disheartening experience for Qi.  Considered to be China's best hope for a swimming medal, she choked in the 200 breast final, finishing 0.01 second behind USA's Amanda Beard for 4th (2:25.35 to 2:25.36).  Ironically, her time in the semifinal, 2:24.21, which was a national record, could have been fast enough to win the final, which was won by Hungary's Ágnes Kovács at 2:24.35.

The Olympic experience prompted Qi to train much harder, and it paid off soon.  She set her first world record in January 2001 in Paris with a 2:19.25 for the 200 breaststroke (short course), followed shortly by a 2:22.99 world record in the long course pool, breaking Penny Heyns' original mark by 0.65 sec.  She also won the 2001 East Asian Games easily in 2:25.33.  However, she faltered at the 2001 World Championships in Fukuoka, finishing 2nd in her pet event behind Kovacs (2:24.90 to 2:25.09).  She won a bronze in the 200 individual medley (2:12.46 personal best) and was 4th in the 400 individual medley (4:41.64).  The 2001 Chinese National Games was disappointing for Qi too: she failed to win any gold medals, being out-touched by the relatively unknown Luo Nan in the 200 breaststroke (2:24.76 to 2:24.80), was 2nd in the 400 individual medley after former world record holder Chen Yan (4:35.22 to 4:38.20) and 3rd in the 100 breast (1:09.12) behind Luo Xuejuan and Luo Nan.

2002 was a fruitful year for Qi, as she swam a 2:23.74 200 breaststroke (fastest time of the year, and 3rd fastest all time) at the Chinese Nationals, won her first world title at the Short Course Worlds in Moscow (2:20.91 in the 200 breaststroke), and took home three golds (200 breaststroke: 2:24.01; 200 individual medley: 2:13.94 and 400 individual medley: 4:40.37) and 1 silver (100 breaststroke: 1:08.24) at the 2002 Asian Games in Busan, Korea in October.  She also took down her own 200 breast world record (short course) to 2:18.86 in December.

At the 2003 World Championships, Qi finished 3rd in the 200 breaststroke (2:25.78) behind USA's Amanda Beard (who won by tying Qi's world record of 2:22.99) and Australia's Leisel Jones (2:24.33, Commonwealth record).  Qi was 4th in the 200 individual medley and 9th in the 400 individual medley.

In 2004, Qi made her 2nd Olympic team with relative ease, but before the 2004 Olympics, she lost her (joint) world record to Leisel Jones, who swam a 2:22.96 in Brisbane, and this was followed by Amanda Beard's world record of 2:22.44 at the US Olympics Trials a few days later.  At the 200 meter breastroke at the Games, Qi was in 3rd place at the 150m mark.  However, she ran out of gas and posted a 38.99 second final 50m, the slowest final lap among the 8 finalists, and dropped to 6th at 2:26.35 (incidentally, she had also swum the slowest final lap in the 200 breaststroke final in the 2000 Olympics).  In the Olympics, Qi also entered the 100 breaststroke but was disqualified in the final for an illegal underwater dolphin kick.  The race was won by her compatriot Luo Xuejuan at 1:06.64.  Qi also placed 29th in the 200 individual medley in 2:26.02.

Qi continued to train after the Olympics.  She competed in the 2004 World Short Course Championships in Indianapolis but did not win any medals.

Qi skipped the 2005 World Championships in Montreal to concentrate on the Chinese National Games in October, where she regained her old form by winning the 200 breaststroke (2:24.14), 200 individual medley (2:12.17) and the 400 individual medley (4:38.24), and placing 2nd in the 100 breaststroke (in a personal best of 1:07.27).  She also won the 200 individual medley (2:09.33) and the 400 individual medley (4:34.28) and the 200m breaststroke (2:20.72) at the 2006 World Short Course Championship in Shanghai.  She won the same three events at the Doha Asian Games --- 200 individual medley at 2:11.92; 400 individual medley at 4:38.31 and 200 breaststroke at 2:23.93.  All times ranked among the top 4 globally in 2006.

The 2007 World Championships was the worst international meet in Qi's career.  Having switched to a new training approach which proved to be unsuitable for her, she performed poorly in her two individual medley races in Melbourne, though she managed to make the semifinals in the 200 breaststroke.

Still motivated, Qi was determined to make an attempt to qualify for her third Olympics, to be held in her home country in 2008.  Her more recent international appearance was the World Military Games in Hyderabad, India, in October 2007, where she won the 200 breaststroke (2:29.23) and took silver in the 100 meter breaststroke (1:09.52).

She showed even more promising signs at the Good Luck Beijing 2008 Swimming China Open, held in the "WaterCube" (venue for 2008 Olympic swimming and diving competitions) in early February, where she posted solid times in the 200 individual medley (2:14.14), 100 breaststroke (1:08.22) and 200 breaststroke (2:27.11).

At the 2008 Olympics in Beijing she finished 13th in the 200 meter breaststroke and 20th in the 200 meter individual medley.

See also
China at the 2008 Summer Olympics

References

External links
 Beijing 2008 Team China Profile

1985 births
Living people
Chinese female freestyle swimmers
Chinese female breaststroke swimmers
Chinese female medley swimmers
Olympic swimmers of China
Sportspeople from Fuzhou
Swimmers at the 2004 Summer Olympics
Swimmers at the 2008 Summer Olympics
World record setters in swimming
World Aquatics Championships medalists in swimming
Swimmers from Fujian
Medalists at the FINA World Swimming Championships (25 m)
Asian Games medalists in swimming
Swimmers at the 1998 Asian Games
Swimmers at the 2002 Asian Games
Swimmers at the 2006 Asian Games
Universiade medalists in swimming
Asian Games gold medalists for China
Asian Games silver medalists for China
Medalists at the 1998 Asian Games
Medalists at the 2002 Asian Games
Medalists at the 2006 Asian Games
Universiade gold medalists for China
Medalists at the 2003 Summer Universiade
Medalists at the 2005 Summer Universiade
Competitors at the 1998 Goodwill Games
21st-century Chinese women